Li Yu (born December 2, 1973) is a female Chinese film director and screenwriter. Li began her career in entertainment at a young age, serving as a presenter at a local TV station. After college she worked for CCTV where she directed television programs before moving onto documentaries and, eventually, feature films.

Directorial career
Her feature film debut came with 2001's Fish and Elephant, purportedly the first mainland Chinese feature to tackle the subject of lesbianism. The film was screened abroad with some difficulty, but for the most part was not given an opportunity to screen before mainland Chinese audiences.

Her next film, Dam Street, was plagued less by problems, and garnered Li the Golden Lotus from the specialty Deauville Asian Film Festival in 2006.

In 2007, Li Yu's most high-profile film yet, Lost in Beijing premiered at the 2007 Berlin International Film Festival. The result was over a year of controversy with the Chinese Film Bureau over both the appropriateness of that screening and of the content of the film. Though briefly screened in a heavily edited state, the film was eventually banned outright, though it was given limited releases abroad, including in the United States.

In 2010, Li Yu's coming-of-age film Buddha Mountain won the Award for Best Artistic Contribution at the 23rd Tokyo International Film Festival.

From being the host of local channel station, to a documentary director in CCTV, Li Yu was never satisfied with her career. Her documentary film style was known for making people uncomfortable and Li decided to make the story into a movie. However she could not find a sponsor for her project. Li decided to sell her house after she could not find a sponsor and invest in her project herself. This act eventually leads to her first movie, "Fish and Elephant". 
After the movie was completed, Li and her boyfriend have to begin living at a friend's apartment. She quit her job before making the movie, she and her boyfriend had been living in her friend's house and had nowhere else to go. Li's boyfriend could not take this anymore and eventually called her uncle to convince Li to move out. Following this, Li had to borrow money from the other people in order to rent her own place. In addition, she had to start making her documentary again during that period. 
 
One of Li's friends from the United States sent her first movie "Fish and Elephant" to Venice and unexpectedly was selected to participate in a film festival. However, the staff made a mistake that had lost one of the tapes of the film causing the whole project to play incoherently. International reporters were laughing at the film while it was playing. Li angrily stood up and shouted, "This is not my movie, stop playing.  I quit this film festival!" Li the stormed out and began to cry. The festival finally solved this problem with the tapes that were sent by Li but did not show any subtitles. At the end, she got an award for the contribution she made to female film.

Awards
 2012 - 9th Guangzhou Student Film Festival Award for The Most Popular Director by "Double Exposure" (Winner)
 2011 - Singapore International Film Festival - Silver Screen Awards - Best Asian Feature Film for Buddha Mountain (Winner)
 2011 - Barcelona, Spain Casa Asia Film Festival Week (Asia Film Week) Best Film Award by "Buddha Mountain" (Winner)
 2010 - 23rd Tokyo International Film Festival Award for Best Artistic Contribution by "Buddha Mountain" (Winner)
 2010 - 23rd Tokyo International Film Festival The Main Competition - Tokyo Award "Buddha Mountain" (Nominated)
 2007 - 5th Bangkok International Film Festival Jury Prize "Lost in Beijing" (Winner)
 2007 - 6th Tribeca Film Festival Screenplay Honor Award "Lost in Beijing" (Winner)
 2007 - 57th Berlin International Film Festival - Main Competition - The Golden Bear "Lost in Beijing" (Nominated)
 2006 - 6th Chinese Film Media Awards Best New Director Award "Dam Street" (Winner)
 2005 - 62nd Venice International Film Festival International League Art Film Award "Dam Street" (Winner)
 2002 - 52nd Berlin International Film Festival - Promotion of Asian Cinema Award - Special mention "Fish and Elephant" (Winner)
 2001 - 58th Venice International Film Festival Film Award for Female Subjects "Fish and Elephant" (Winner)

Filmography

References

External links

February, 2007: "Li Yu, Filmmaker," from The Hollywood Reporter

Film directors from Shandong
Chinese women film directors
Chinese documentary filmmakers
People from Zouping
1973 births
Living people
Screenwriters from Shandong
Chinese women screenwriters
Women documentary filmmakers
Writers from Binzhou